A placental infarction results from the interruption of blood supply to a part of the placenta, causing its cells to die.

Small placental infarcts, especially at the edge of the placental disc, are considered to be normal at term. Large placental infarcts are associated with vascular abnormalities, e.g. hypertrophic decidual vasculopathy, as seen in hypertension. Very large infarcts lead to placental insufficiency and may result in fetal death.

Relation to maternal floor infarct
Maternal floor infarcts are not considered to be true placental infarcts, as they result from deposition of fibrin around the chorionic villi, i.e. perivillous fibrin deposition.

See also
Placental disease

References

External links 

Gross pathology of a placental infarct (utah.edu)

Complications of labour and delivery